Assimineidae is a family of minute snails, also known as palmleaf snails, with an operculum, gastropod mollusks or micromollusks in the superfamily Rissoidae. Many of these very small snails live in intermediate habitats, being amphibious between saltwater and land; others live in freshwater.

Distribution 
The distribution of the Assimineidae is worldwide. The oldest fossils are known from the Cenomanian aged Burmese amber.

Ecology 
Various species in this family occur in estuarine habitats, in salt marshes and in freshwater. Some are terrestrial or amphibious.

Description 
The shell is small to medium large, more or less egg-conelike shaped. The apertural margin is simple. The operculum is in most cases horny.

Species in this family are characterized by rudimentary cephalic tentacles, a trunklike snout, a foot with a groove and rudimentary to absent ctenidium (a comb-like respiratory apparatus).

Taxonomy 
The following three subfamilies were recognized in the taxonomy of Bouchet & Rocroi (2005):
 Subfamily Assimineinae H. Adams & A. Adams, 1856 - synonym: Synceratidae Bartsch, 1920
 Subfamily Ekadantinae Thiele, 1929 - synonyms: Paludinellidae Kobelt, 1878 (n.a.); Cyclotropidae Iredale, 1941
 Subfamily Omphalotropidinae Thiele, 1927 - Realiinae L. Pfeiffer, 1853 (inv.); Adelomorphinae Kobelt, 1906 (inv.); Garrettiinae Kobelt, 1906; Pseudocyclotini Thiele, 1929; Thaanumellinae Clench, 1946; Tutuilanidae Hubendick, 1952

Genera
Genera in the family Assimineidae include:

Genus † Laternoides W. Yu & Y.-H. Xi, 1977 

subfamily Assimineinae
 Angustassiminea Habe, 1943
 Assiminea Fleming, 1828 - type genus of Assimineidae, synonym: Assiminia
 Austropilula Thiele, 1927
 Aviassiminea Fukuda & Ponder, 2003
 Conassiminea Fukuda & Ponder, 2006
 Cryptassiminea Fukuda & Ponder, 2005
 Euassiminea Heude, 1882
 Macrassiminea Thiele, 1927
 Ovassiminea Thiele, 1927
 Pseudomphala Heude, 1882
 Sculptassiminea Thiele, 1927

subfamily Ekadantinae
 Acmella Blanford, 1869
 Cavernacmella Habe, 1942
 Cyclotropis Tapparone Canefri, 1883
 Ekadanta Rao, 1928
 Metassiminea Thiele, 1927
 Optediceros Leith, 1853
 Paludinella Pfeiffer, 1841
 Rugapedia Fukuda & Ponder, 2004
 Solenomphala Heude, 1882
 Taiwanassiminea Kuroda & Habe, 1950

subfamily Omphalotropidinae Thiele, 1927 (synonym: Garrettiinae Kobelt, 1906)
 Allepithema Tomlin, 1931
 Anaglyphula B. Rensch, 1932
 Atropis Pease, 1871
 Austroassiminea Solem, Girardi, Slack-Smith & Kendrick, 1982
 Balambania Crosse, 1891
 Chalicopoma Möllendorff, 1894
 Conacmella Thiele, 1925
 Crossilla Thiele, 1927
 Cyclomorpha Pease, 1871
 Ditropisena Iredale, 1933
 Duritropis Iredale, 1944
 Electrina Baird, 1850
 Eussoia Preston, 1912
 Fijianella C. M. Cooke & Clench, 1943
 Garrettia Paetel, 1873
 Kubaryia Clench, 1948
 Leucostele Thiele, 1927
 Limborelia Iredale, 1944
 Nesopoma Clench, 1958
 Omphalotropis Pfeiffer, 1851 - type genus of the subfamily Omphalotropidinae
 Opinorelia Iredale, 1944
 Paludinellassiminea Habe, 1994
 Ponapella Clench, 1946
 Pseudassiminea Thiele, 1927
 Pseudocyclotus Thiele, 1894
 Pseudogibbula Dautzenberg, 1890
 Quadrasiella 	Moellendorff, 1894
 Rapanella Cooke & Clench, 1943
 Rupacilla Thiele, 1927
 Scalinella Pease, 1867
 Schuettiella Brandt, 1974
 Setaepoma Clench, 1955
 Spiratropis Kobelt & Möllendorff, 1900
 Suterilla Thiele, 1927
 Sychnotropis Möllendorff, 1898
 Telmosena Iredale, 1944
 Thaanumella Clench, 1946
 Turbacmella Thiele, 1927
 Tutuilana Hubendick, 1952
 Wrayanna Clench, 1948

incertae sedis
 Assimineidae incertae sedis vulgaris Webster, 1905 
 Assimineidae incertae sedis turrita (W. H. Turton, 1932) (taxon inquirendum)
 Assimineidae incertae sedis turritella (W. H. Turton, 1932) (taxon inquirendum)

Synonyms
 Adelomorpha Tapparone Canefri, 1886: synonym of Pseudocyclotus Thiele, 1894 (Invalid: Junior homonym of Adelomorpha Snellen, 1885 [Lepidoptera])
 Adelostoma E. A. Smith, 1885: synonym of Pseudocyclotus Thiele, 1894 (invalid: junior homonym of Adelostoma Duponchel, 1827)
 Assemania Dollfus, 1912: synonym of Assiminea J. Fleming, 1828 (unjustified emendation)
 Assimania: synonym of Assiminea J. Fleming, 1828 (incorrect spelling of genus name)
 Assiminella Monterosato, 1906: synonym of Paludinella L. Pfeiffer, 1841 (unnecessary substitute name for Paludinella L. Pfeiffer, 1841)
 Assiminia J. Fleming, 1828: synonym of Assiminea J. Fleming, 1828 (alternative original spelling [used in the index p. 557])
 Diadema Pease, 1868: synonym of Garrettia Paetel, 1873 (invalid: junior homonym of Diadema Gray, 1825)
 Dramelia Iredale, 1941: synonym of Acmella W. T. Blanford, 1869 (junior synonym)
 Heteropoma Möllendorff, 1894: synonym of Allepithema Tomlin, 1931 (invalid: junior homonym of Heteropoma Benson, 1856; Allepithema is a replacement name)
 Paludinassiminea Matsubayashi & Habe, 1990: synonym of Solenomphala Heude, 1882 (unavailable name: no type species designated)
 Tribe Pseudocyclotini Thiele, 1929: synonym of Omphalotropidinae Thiele, 1927
 Scalinella Pease, 1868: synonym of Omphalotropis L. Pfeiffer, 1851
 Stenotropis Kobelt & Möllendorff, 1898: synonym of Omphalotropis  (Stenotropis) Kobelt & Möllendorff, 1898 represented as Omphalotropis L. Pfeiffer, 1851
 Syncera Gray, 1821 (nomen nudum)

References
This article incorporates public domain text from the reference.

External links

 

pt:Assiminea